The Bahrain national rugby sevens team is a minor sevens side. They have competed in the Hong Kong Sevens. They are traditionally seen as "minnows". For example, in the 1989 Hong Kong Sevens, they lost 52-0 to New Zealand and 24-4 to the Netherlands.

References

External links 
 McLaren Bill, A Visit to Hong Kong in Starmer-Smith, Nigel & Robertson, Ian (eds) The Whitbread Rugby World '90 (Lennard Books, 1989)

Rugby union in Bahrain
National rugby sevens teams
National sports teams of Bahrain